St. Mary's Church is a church in the unincorporated community of St. Benedict, Kansas, 3 miles north of the west edge of Seneca. It is part of the Roman Catholic Archdiocese of Kansas City in Kansas. It was built in 1893 and added to the National Register of Historic Places in 1980. It is a prominent local landmark as it is upon a hill and its bell tower rises .

Gallery

References

External links

Buildings and structures in Nemaha County, Kansas
Churches in Kansas
Churches on the National Register of Historic Places in Kansas
Churches completed in 1893
National Register of Historic Places in Nemaha County, Kansas
Gothic Revival architecture in Kansas